Cratoxylum glaucum is a plant in the family Hypericaceae. The specific epithet  is from the Latin meaning "blue-green", referring to the colour of the leaf underside.

Description
The flaky bark is  reddish brown. The flowers are crimson.

Distribution and habitat
Cratoxylum glaucum grows naturally in Sumatra, Peninsular Malaysia and Borneo (including offshore islands). Its habitat is forests (including kerangas forests) from sea-level to  altitude.

References

glaucum
Flora of Sumatra
Flora of Peninsular Malaysia
Flora of Borneo